Ammosperma is a genus of flowering plants belonging to the family Brassicaceae.

Its native range is Northern Africa.

Species:

Ammosperma cinereum 
Ammosperma variabile

References

Brassicaceae
Brassicaceae genera